Z'ev ben Shimon Halevi (English name Warren Kenton, 8 January 1933 - 21 September 2020) was an author of books on the Toledano Tradition of Kabbalah, a teacher of the discipline, with a worldwide following, and a founding member of the Kabbalah Society.

Early life 

Z'ev ben Shimon Halevi was born, on 8 January 1933, into a Jewish family in London, England, where he continued to live and work, along with his wife, Rebekah. On his father's side of the family, he was descended from a rabbinical Sephardi line with roots in Bessarabia which was, at the turn of the 20th century, a province of Russia. On his mother's side, he was descended from a Polish Ashkenazi family.  His Ashkenazi great-grandfather was Zerah Barnet, who helped found the Orthodox Meah Shearim district, just outside the Old City of Jerusalem, and a Hebrew yeshiva in Jaffa.

Many of his publications are issued under his Hebrew name, Z'ev ben Shimon Halevi, a contraction of his full family name of Z'ev ben Shimon ben Joshua Haham-Halevi. The name Haham is applied to a lineage of teachers in Sephardi culture; it means "wise one." Both his paternal and maternal families were Levites, according to family records. When his grandfather migrated to England in 1900 the surname Haham was recorded as Kaufman; it was later changed to Kenton.

When World War Two began, he and his family moved to a small village just beyond Beaconsfield. He attended primary and secondary schools in the town, but he later moved back to London as a student at Saint Martin's School of Art and the Royal Academy, studying painting during his time there. He remained in London for the rest of his life. After college he kept up his artwork, some of which was commissioned. Further work included working in general and psychiatric hospitals, as well as in a theatre workshop and at the Royal Opera House.

Besides theatre work and practising graphic design , he also taught at RADA and the Architectural Association. He ran workshops for the Wrekin Trust and lectured at the Theosophical Society, the Royal College of Art and the Prince of Wales Institute of Architecture.

Later Career: Kabbalistic work 

He first started studying Kabbalah at the age of 25 and was a student and tutor of Kabbalah for more than 60 years, beginning to teach in 1971. During this time he visited nearly all the old major centres of Kabbalah in Europe, North Africa and Israel, while specialising in the Toledano Tradition, a form that derives from the Sephardi Kabbalah which developed in early medieval Spain and France and which included among its focal points the towns of Lunel, Posquières, Girona  and the city of Toledo. 

These and other centres flowered, producing among their practitioners of mysticism and Kabbalah Isaac the Blind, Azriel of Gerona, Ezra ben Solomon, and Nachmanides. During this period Kabbalists incorporated into their expositions and exegeses a degree of Neoplatonic emanationism, first introduced into Spain by Solomon ibn Gabirol, that conformed to the requirements of Jewish theology and philosophy. To some extent, in medieval times, it conflicted with the Aristotelian approach to Jewish philosophy by Maimonides and his followers. As defined by the Provencal/Catalan Kabbalists, emanationism was concerned with how the transcendent God, called Ein Sof by Kabbalists, caused potentialities to flow into Existence via what became named as the 10 Sephirot in order to bring about Creation.

A fellow of the Temenos Academy, UK, instituted by the poet, Kathleen Raine, Halevi regularly lectured there.  He taught groups on every continent, including at Interface Boston, the New York Open Centre; The Centre for Psychological Astrology, UK; Omega Institute; New York Kabbalah Society; the Jungian Institute of Santa Fe, New Mexico; and Karen Kabbalah, Atlanta, as well as in synagogues and at rabbinical colleges. He was the Director of Tutors for the Kabbalah Society and for many years ran a series of Kabbalah courses at Regent's College in London.

He traveled widely and ran a continuing series of Way of Kabbalah courses and lectures held in many countries, including America, Australia, Brazil, Canada, England, Germany, Holland, Israel, Japan, Mexico, Scotland and Spain, though few of his lectures have been published and fewer still are online; similarly with his articles. Over the years, he also took part in a series of interviews for various media.

Halevi was as well known a writer as he was a teacher of Kabbalah, having published 18 books, including a kabbalistic novel and books on astrology and kabbalistic astrology. Contemporary astrologers such as Judy Hall refer to the work he has done on the latter.  In the earlier part of his career he wrote a number of books on stagecraft. Both he and his work on the Toledano Tradition are publicly recognized, and his work has now been translated into sixteen languages, to date, including Hebrew.

He also set up an annual Summer School, aided by his wife, which regularly included students from around the world, and he started up an annual series of workshops in London. At his home, he also held regular weekly meetings, during term time, of the London Kabbalah Group. This part of his work continued for many years.

Halevi was one of the founder members of the Kabbalah Society, which was set up to encourage the study of late C12th and early C13th Kabbalah in Provence and Spain.

He died at his home in London, 21 September 2020, after a short illness.

Influence 

King Charles III

In an introduction to the Sacred Web Conference, University of Alberta, Edmonton, Alberta, 23/24 September 2006 at the University of Alberta in 2006, King Charles III, a Patron of the Temenos Academy, said, when talking of the tension between Tradition and Modernism:

This dilemma is captured in ancient notions of balance and harmony; notions that are, for example, expressed in many guises in that wonderful Kabbalistic diagram of the Tree of Life. As the Temenos Fellow, Warren Kenton, so beautifully explains in his lectures to the students of the Academy, the teaching of the Tree of Life is that the "active" and the "passive" aspects of life, which on their own may lead to imbalance and disharmony, must be, can only be, brought together in harmony by the influx into our lives of the Divine and the Sacred. Whether or not we interpret this image as an explanation of an outer or an inner orientation, it is in this way, and only in this way, that the forces, or characteristics, of expansion and constraint can be brought into balance.

There is a DVD that includes this portion of the King's talk on the World Wisdom website. 

Kathleen Raine

The poet, Kathleen Raine, had this to say about Halevi's work:

A feature of this author's system not found in others (although doubtless it is traditional though not universally taught) is the beautiful way in which the interfaces of each 'world' overlap with the one above (or below). Thus, the highest experiences of the physical world overlap the lower part of the next world (the psychological]: and again psyche's highest experiences of the individual soul coincide with spiritual regions of the transpersonal world of universal forms. So from illumination to illumination we reascend the 'ladder' by which each of us 'came down to earth from heaven'. The awe-inspiring sublimity of the Kabbalistic universe at once convinces and comforts. It is our destiny to descend and to fulfil some task, learn some lesson in the natural world; as it is to follow the path of return, to reascend from world to world, no matter how many lifetimes this may take us before we return to our true home, 'the kingdom of Heaven'. Kathleen Raine, Light Magazine, Spring 1989.

Sinéad O'Connor

Singer Sinéad O'Connor wrote in the inner sleeve notes to the album, I Do Not Want What I Haven't Got, "Special thanks to Selina Marshall + Warren Kenton for showing me that all I'd need was inside me."

Charles Thomson

Artist Charles Thomson said, "I studied Kabbalah under a teacher called Warren Kenton, who said there was a lot of humour at the spiritual level, and I think that's true."

Bibliography 

Early books on Stagecraft
 Introducing Stagecraft, (as Warren Kenton), Drake Publishers, c.1971
 Play Begins: A Documentary-Novel upon the Mounting of a Play, (as Warren Kenton), Elek Books. 1971
 Stage Properties and How to Make Them, (as Warren Kenton), Pitman, 1978

Subsequent books on Kabbalah
 An Introduction to the Cabala: Tree of Life, Rider, 1972; Samuel Weiser, 1991
 Adam and the Kabbalistic Tree, Rider, London 1974
 A Kabbalistic Universe, Samuel Weiser, 1977; Gateway, 1988
 Kabbalah: A Tradition of Hidden Knowledge Thames and Hudson, 1979
 Kabbalah and Exodus, Rider, 1980, Samuel Weiser, 1988 and Gateway Books, 1993
 The Work of the Kabbalist, Gateway, 1984; Samuel Weiser, 1993
 The School of the Soul, Gateway Books, 1985
 Psychology and Kabbalah Samuel Weiser, 1986; Gateway, 1991
 The Way of Kabbalah, Gateway Books, 1991
 Kabbalah: The Divine Plan, Harper Collins, 1996
 Introduction to the World of Kabbalah, Kabbalah Society: Tree of Life Publishing (UK), 2008
 The Path of a Kabbalist: An Autobiography, Kabbalah Society: Tree of Life Publishing (UK), 2009
 A Kabbalistic View of History, Kabbalah Society: Tree of Life Publishing (UK), 2013
 Kabbalistic Contemplations, pub. Bet El Trust (UK), 2021

Astrological works
 As Above so Below: A Study in Cosmic Progression, (as Warren Kenton), Stuart and Watkins, 1969
 Astrology: The Celestial Mirror, (as Warren Kenton), Thames and Hudson, 1974
 Astrology and Kabbalah, pub. Urania Trust, 2000: formerly published as The Anatomy of Fate, Gateway Books, 1978

Kabbalistic novel
 The Anointed, Penguin Arcana, 1987.

Audio CDs
 Way of Kabbalah Meditations, Tree of Life Publishing (UK), 2004

Reception 

A professor of Kabbalah at Hebrew University of Jerusalem has bemoaned the hijacking of kabba'lah by various New Age authors and gave Halevi as an example. Joseph Dan, in his work The Heart and the Fountain: An Anthology of Jewish Mystical Experiences, wrote in footnote 57 to the introduction:

Another distressing phenomenon is connected with the numerous books concerning kabbalah, its history, nature, and traditions, as instruction for modern living, published by "Z'ev ben Shimon Halevi" who is a nice English gentleman from Hampstead who does not know any Hebrew. His books were used as authentic, scholarly source by many, including Simo Parpola.

References

Further reading 

Dan, Joseph, Jewish Mysticism and Jewish Ethics, pub. J. Aronson Inc., 2nd edition, 1977
 
Dan, Joseph, The Early Kabbalah, pub. Paulist Press, 1986
 
Gerzon, Gila, Kabbalah: Gates of Knowledge, pub. Aur Tiferet, 2020

Goodman, Len, ed., Neoplatonism and Jewish Thought, pub. Albany: SUNY Press, 1992

Halevi, Z'ev ben Shimon, A Kabbalistic Universe, pub. Bet El Trust, revised edition, 2016

Scholem, Gershom, Origins of the Kabbalah, pub. Princeton Paperbacks, 1991

Scholem, Gershom, ha-Qabbalah be-Gerona, ed. J. Ben-Shlomo, pub. Jerusalem, 1964

External links 
The Kabbalah Society (Toledano tradition)
Interview with Z'ev ben Shimon Halevi
Video conversation
His books in Spanish
The Temenos Academy
Artwork
Development of Halevi's work as it relates to Judaism and in the everyday world

1933 births
2020 deaths
Writers from London
English Sephardi Jews
British people of Moldovan-Jewish descent
Kabbalists
English religious writers
English astrologers
20th-century astrologers
21st-century astrologers
Alumni of Saint Martin's School of Art